Peng Zhaoqin (born 8 May 1968 in Guangzhou, Guangdong) is a Chinese-born Dutch chess player. In October 2004, she was the eleventh woman ever to be awarded the FIDE title of Grandmaster.

She won three times the Chinese women's chess championship, in 1987, 1990 and 1993. She has resided in the Netherlands since 1996. Peng has won the Dutch women's championship an unprecedented fourteen times, landing her first title in 1997 and then winning twelve more in an uninterrupted sequence from 2000 to 2011. She tied for first with Alexandra Kosteniuk at the European Women's Chess Championship of 2004 in Dresden, and took the silver medal on tiebreak. Thanks to this result, Peng was awarded the title of Grandmaster.  

In the 2011 Dutch women's championship, Peng won nine games out of ten, placing a full three points ahead of her closest competitor.

See also
Chess in China

References

External links

 
 
 
 
 Complete Chess match Tea Lanchava vs Peng Zhaoqin
 The BDO Chess Tournament 2006 — a report by Peng Zhaoqin

1968 births
Living people
Chinese female chess players
Dutch female chess players
Chess grandmasters
Female chess grandmasters
Chess woman grandmasters
Chinese emigrants to the Netherlands
Chess players from Guangzhou